Axel Gabriel Sjöström (16 August 1794 – 11 December 1846) was a Finnish educator and poet.

Biography
He was born in Janakkala, and became professor of Greek Literature at the Imperial Alexander University in Helsinki in 1833. He married Margareta Sofia Helsberg in 1828. During his lifetime a few of his poems earned him a high, but short-lived, reputation in Finnish literary circles. Aside from original poetry, Sjöström also did translations from Greek (Homer, Euripides, Anacreon, Theocritus, and Johan Paulinus-Lillienstedt's Magnus Principatus Finlandia) and German (Goethe and Romantic poets).

References

Other sources
 Schoolfield, George C. A History of Finland's Literature, p. 300. University of Nebraska Press, 1998. 

1794 births
1846 deaths
Finnish male poets
People from Janakkala
19th-century Finnish poets
19th-century male writers